East Timor–Sahrawi Republic relations refers to the current and historical relations between the East Timor and the Sahrawi Arab Democratic Republic (SADR).

History
The SADR was one of the first states to establish formal diplomatic relations with East Timor, after its independence on 20 May 2002, in part due to the long-time strong ties and the historical parallels between the two national liberation movements, FRETILIN and POLISARIO.

Diplomatic missions
A Sahrawi embassy was opened in Dili in 2010, during Xanana Gusmão's government.

References

 
Sahrawi Arab Democratic Republic
Bilateral relations of the Sahrawi Arab Democratic Republic
2002 establishments in East Timor
2002 establishments in Western Sahara